is a Japanese manga series written and illustrated by Hiroshi Shiibashi. It was serialized in Shueisha's Weekly Shōnen Jump from March 2008 to June 2012, and later in Jump Next! from August to December 2012. Its chapters were collected in twenty-five tankōbon volumes by Shueisha.

A 24-episode anime adaptation produced by Studio Deen was broadcast in Japan from July to December 2010. A 24-episode second season, titled Nura: Rise of the Yokai Clan - Demon Capital, was broadcast from July to December 2011.

In North America, Viz Media licensed the series for English-language release of the manga and anime adaptations. It was streamed on Viz Anime in 2010, while the twenty-five volumes of the manga were released from February 2011 to February 2015.

Plot

Rikuo Nura is 3/4 human and 1/4 yōkai, in which he has a human form in the day but transforms into his yōkai form at night. He lives in a house full of yōkai along with his yōkai grandfather. Trying to escape his fate, he does good deeds in order to avoid becoming a yōkai, despite his grandfather's wish that Rikuo succeed him as the Third Head of the Nura Clan. Rikuo is different because he helps humans. He eventually comes to terms with his yōkai blood and decides to take up the position of the Third Head of the Nura Clan. Multiple factions aim to stop him or usurp his position, and he must gather friends and allies, a new Hyakki Yakō under his banner of "Fear".

Storyline
Gyuki's Test Arc
The Kiyojuji Paranormal Patrol travels to Mt. Nejireme at the invitation of a supposed yōkai specialist. However, the invitation turns out to have been a trap by the head of the Gyuki Clan. Separated, the members of the Kiyojuji Paranormal Patrol must deal with yōkai of the Gyuki Clan and Rikuo ultimately faces Gyuki himself. Rikuo learns that Gyuki set up the trap because he didn't want the Nura Clan, which he greatly cherishes, to suffer under the influence of a weak leader. The two clash and Gyuki is overwhelmed by Rikuo's night form. Afterward, Rikuo decides to take up the mantle of Nurarihyon and officially become the next Nura Clan head.
Shikoku Arc
When one of the board members of the Nura Clan is attacked and killed, and Nurarihyon subsequently disappears without notice, the Nura Clan is thrown into chaos. Trying to keep them together, Rikuo encounters a rival faction from the Shikoku area who intend to take over the Nura Clan's territory. Their leader, Tamazuki, is ruthless and willing to sacrifice his subordinates to further his own goals. Rikuo and his Hyakki Yakō battle with Tamazuki and his Hachijuuhakki Yakō (consisting of 88 demons, instead of the 100 of a Hyakki Yakō) and emerge victorious. However, Rikuo decides to spare Tamazuki after the battle at the request of his father - who Nurarihyon had gone to visit. Tamazuki is spared under the condition that he build a memorial in honor of the subordinates who died by his hand.
Past Arc
The story of Rikuo's grandparents Nurarihyon and Yohime, the creation of the spirit blade Nenekirimaru and the battle against Hagoromo Gitsune 400 years ago.
Tono Arc
When Haguromo Gitsune resurfaces in Kyoto, Rikuo is determined to fight her and take revenge for his father's death - as well as rescue Yura, who has gone to aid the rest of the Keikain family in protecting Kyoto. However, as he is still too inexperienced and weak, his grandfather asks the head of the yōkai Tono Village to take in and train Rikuo. After an encounter with one of the Kyoto yōkai, Rikuo comes to realize what sort of power the yōkai Nurarihyon possesses and, having grown stronger, leaves along with several Tono yōkai to return to the Nura House and prepare for the assault on Kyoto.
Kyoto Arc
Rikuo, along with the vast majority of the Nura Clan and several yōkai from Tono, invade Kyoto. Nearly all of the onmyoji barriers around the city have been destroyed by Kyoto yōkai, and the Keikain House itself struggles to fight against Hagoromo Gitsune's forces. They ultimately join forces with Rikuo's Hyakki Yakō to replace the fallen barriers and stop Hagoromo Gitsune from giving birth to a new evil.
Hundred Tales Clan Arc
After the battle with Hagoromo Gitsune's forces and the resurrected Abe no Seimei, also known as Nue, Rikuo and the Nura Clan are challenged by the remnants of the Hundred Tales Clan and its executives. The clan was once led by a human named Sanmoto Gorozaemon who grew in power by spreading stories about yōkai and in turn created them. The group was destroyed by Rihan and the Nura Clan 350 years ago. Now, the clan is encroaching on the Nura Clan's territory and working to revive Sanmoto's main body, which resides in hell.
Gokadoin House Arc
Following the battle with Sanmoto Gorozaemon and his Hundred Tales Clan, it was revealed that the onmyoji sect known as the Gokadoin House is composed of Abe no Seimei's descendants who used Seimei's forbidden research on immortality to prolong their lives. When the Gokadoin house starts mobilizing to "purify" the land of yōkai and humans, Rikuo starts to establish an alliance between the various yōkai clans throughout Japan.

Media

Manga

Nura: Rise of the Yokai Clan is written and illustrated by Hiroshi Shiibashi. A first one-shot chapter was published in Shueisha's Weekly Shōnen Jump on July 30, 2007. The manga was serialized in the same magazine from March 10, 2008, to June 25, 2012. The series' final story arc ran for three in the seasonally published Jump Next!, from August 11 to December 28, 2012. Shueisha collected its 210 individual chapters in twenty-five tankōbon volumes, released from August 4, 2008, to March 4, 2013.

The manga was licensed for English release by Viz Media, who published the series chapter wise in its manga anthology Weekly Shonen Jump Alpha since the magazine's launch on January 30, 2012, and in bound volumes since February 1, 2011. As of February 3, 2015, all 25 English-language volumes have been released. The first volume was translated by localization company AltJapan Co., Ltd.

11 years after its finale, a four all-new chapters are set to be published in Shueisha's seinen manga magazine Ultra Jump on April 19, 2023.

Drama CD
A Drama CD was released on December 18, 2009.

Anime

The anime series, produced by Studio Deen, aired from July 6 to December 21, 2010. It is licensed for North America by Viz Media under the name Nura: Rise of the Yokai Clan. New episodes, subtitled in English, were made available for streaming on their website several hours after they aired in Japan. The opening themes are Fast Forward and Sunshine performed by Monkey Majik and the ending themes are Sparky☆Start and Symphonic Dream performed by Katate Size (Aya Hirano, Yui Horie and Ai Maeda). The anime was released on eight DVDs.

The second season, aired in Japan from July 5 to December 20, 2011. It was made available for streaming with English subtitles the next day. Two additional 23-minute OVAs were subsequently released in December 4, 2012 and March 4, 2013 after Demon Capital finished. They were bundled with the limited edition releases of volumes 24 and 25 of the manga.

The English dub of the series was posted for streaming on Viz Media's online network, Neon Alley, which starting on October 2, 2012. Viz Media later released the series on DVD/Blu-ray on March 10, 2014. Originally it was going to be released on January 28, 2014.

Other print media
A character data book titled  was released on July 2, 2010. At 264 pages, it contains information on all the major factions in the series, as well as on Shiibashi and his assistants.

A light novel adaptation written by Satoshi Oosaki with art by Hiroshi Shiibashi was published by J-Books in December 2009. It features the stories of Nurarihyon and Yohime's wedding ceremony and a strange encounter between Zen and Kuromaru, as well as an original tale centering on the yōkai who live in Ukiyoe Town.

Video game
A video game called  was announced as developed by Arc System Works and published by Konami. It was released in November 2011 for the PlayStation 3 and Xbox 360.

Reception
The first tankōbon ranked 9th on Tohan manga charts, the third ranked 5th, the fourth ranked 10th, the fifth ranked 9th, and the sixth ranked 8th, and each volume starting from the third sold over 100,000 copies.
As of December 2018, the manga had 12 million copies in print.

Weekly Shōnen Jump allows its readers to vote on their favorite manga, giving out the Gold Future Cup award each year to the most popular manga one-shot it publishes. In 2007, the Nura: Rise of the Yokai Clan one-shot ranked 1st in the Gold Future Cup.

See also
Teito Monogatari: A historical fantasy novel by Hiroshi Aramata widely recognized for starting the "onmyoji boom" in Japan. The fourth volume of the light novel adaptation of Nurarihyon no Mago (entitled Teito Koi Monogatari) is a direct reference to it.

References

External links
 Anime official website 
 BS11 Site 
 Vomic Site 
 Game official website 
 

2010 anime television series debuts
2011 anime television series debuts
Action anime and manga
Dark fantasy anime and manga
Exorcism in anime and manga
Jump J-Books
Shōnen manga
Shueisha franchises
Shueisha manga
Studio Deen
Supernatural anime and manga
Tokyo MX original programming
Viz Media anime
Viz Media manga
Yōkai in anime and manga
Yomiuri Telecasting Corporation original programming